Live on KUCI is the third release and first live album by The Littlest Man Band. It was released via the band's website for free download (with website registration) on April 2, 2005 (see 2005 in music).

Track listing
 "Leave The Light On"
 "Maybe I"
 "It's You"
 "Stayed Away Too Long"
 "Sunshine"
 "Wrong Bed"
 "Just Like You"
 "Hands Out, Holds Down"
 "Always Sayin'"
 "Drunk Again"
 "Interview Part 1"
 "Interview Part 2"

Personnel
The Littlest Man Band
 Scott Klopfenstein – Lead and Backing Vocals, Keys, Guitars
 Jesse Wilder – Guitar, Keys, Backing Vocals
 Jake Berrey – Acoustic and Electric Bass
 Greg Parkin – Drums
 Dan Regan – Trombone
 Tony Ortega – Trumpet

Additional personnel
 Interviewers: Mike and Ardem from Peace & Unity & Your Mom of KUCI
 Photography: Lisa Huey

Miscellanea
 This is the only official recording of "Hands Out, Holds Down" the band has released.
 Jesse Wilder is heard saying "cricket, cricket" during "Always Sayin'" – in reference to how many fans of the band would yell during that point of the song.  The joke originated from a previous live show and webcast the band performed at Imusicast in Oakland, California.
 Drunk Again is a cover from Scott's last band Reel Big Fish, from the album Cheer Up!, but Scott sang lead vocals in the original song.

The Littlest Man Band albums
2005 live albums